Joseph Paul Miyashima (born November 18, 1957) is an American television and film actor.

Early life
Miyashima was born in Los Angeles to Japanese parents on November 18, 1957.

Career
Miyashima played Pee-wee Herman's Japanese pen pal, Oki Doki, in "Accidental Playhouse", an episode of Pee-Wee's Playhouse. He had a role in an episode ("9 Minutes and 52 Seconds Over Tokyo") of The Tracey Ullman Show, and another in its spin-off, The Simpsons, as the voice of Toshiro, the apprentice chef, in the episode called "One Fish, Two Fish, Blowfish, Blue Fish". In 2006, he played the role of Principal Dave Matsui in the Disney Channel Original Movie High School Musical, and reprised it in High School Musical 3: Senior Year (2008). In 2009 he had a cameo as a police officer in the DCOM Dadnapped.

Filmography

Film

Television

References

External links
 

1957 births
American male film actors
American male television actors
American male voice actors
Living people
American male actors of Japanese descent
American film actors of Asian descent
20th-century American male actors
21st-century American male actors